Bronx museum or The Bronx museum may refer to:

 Bronx Children's Museum
 Bronx Museum of the Arts
 Museum of Bronx History